Wes Breckenridge (born 1968) is an American politician from the state of Iowa. He is a former member of the Iowa House of Representatives who represented the 29th district. Breckenridge announced that, effective September 10, 2021, he would be resigning his seat to take a job with the Iowa Law Enforcement Academy. A special election was held to elect his replacement.

References

External links

Living people
Democratic Party members of the Iowa House of Representatives
21st-century American politicians
1968 births